Yevgeny Viktorovich Tarle ( – 6 January 1955) was a Soviet historian and academician of the Russian Academy of Sciences. He is known for his books about Napoleon's invasion of Russia and on the Crimean War, as well as many other works. Yevgeny Tarle was one of the founders of the Moscow State Institute of International Relations, Russia's diplomatic university.

Life 
Born as Grigory Tarle in Kyiv, Russian Empire (modern-day Ukraine) into a prosperous Jewish family, he adopted the name of Yevgeny in 1893 following his baptism to Orthodox Christianity in Saint Sophia's Cathedral to marry Olga Grigorievna Mikhailova who belonged to Russian nobility. His father, Viktor Grigorievich Tarle, came from Merchantry Social Estate and ran a shop in Kyiv; he also translated books from Russian to German, including Fyodor Dostoyevsky's works. Yevgeny's mother, Rozalia Arnoldovna Tarle, was a housewife who dedicated herself to raising children. He had four siblings.

In 1892, Tarle completed the gymnasium in Kherson and entered the Imperial Novorossiya University on Fyodor Uspensky's recommendation. In a year, he moved to the University of Kyiv to study history and philosophy. He was "the most distinguished student of Ivan Vasilevich Luchitski (1845–1918) of the University of Kyiv".  After finishing his undergraduate education in 1896, he continued there as a graduate student in history.

As a student, Tarle joined Marxist clubs and took an active part in the social democracy movement. He frequently visited Kyivan factory workers as a lecturer and agitator. On 1 May 1900, he was arrested during a secret meeting in the middle of Anatoly Lunacharsky's speech. Tarle was sent to Kherson under police supervision and was forbidden to teach at Imperial universities and gymnasiums. In August, he and his wife could move to Warsaw, where they spent about a year. During that time, he published articles on history in various magazines. In 1901, he was also allowed a two-day visit to St. Petersburg to defend his master's thesis on Thomas More. With the support of colleagues he was finally given permission to work as a privatdozent at the University of St. Petersburg in 1903, a position he held until 1917.

In February 1905, Tarle was arrested again for participating in student protests and excluded from the university. However, after the October Manifesto decriminalized Marxists, he returned and continued his teaching career. To achieve his doctoral degree, he completed a two-volume dissertation about France. His interest in France increased in time: he completed another work on the economic history of France in 1916. From 1913 to 1918, he also served as a professor at the University of Tartu.

Foreign travel
From 1903 to 1914, Tarle traveled to France yearly. He did research in the libraries and archives of Western Europe for all his early works, spending a lot of time at the Archives Nationales (France) in particular. He also contacted many prominent historians and even read a paper at the World Congress of Historical Studies held in London in 1913. The number of his works prior to the Revolution amounted to 211. His most important publications before the revolution were:

Kontinentalnaia blokada v. I: Issledovaniia po istorii promyshelennosti i vneshnei torgovli Frantsii v epokhu Napoleona [The Continental Blockade V. I: Studies in the History of French Industry and Trade under Napoleon] in 1913
Ekonomicheskaia zhizn korolestva Italii v tsarstvovaniie Napoleona [The Economic Situation of Italy during the Napoleonic Era], which was first published in 1916 and in the following years also in French (1928) and in Italian (1950).
Pechat’vo Frantsii pri Napoleone [The French Press under Napoleon] published in 1913
Rabochii klass vo Frantsii v epokhu revoliutsii [The French Working Class during the Revolution] (1909–1911)

Soviet era and exile
Russian historical scholarship was deeply affected by the October Revolution. Despite this, Tarle remained at the University of St. Petersburg. From 1918 on he also headed the Petrograd department of the Central Archives of RSFSR. He soon became a professor at Moscow University and moved to Moscow. In 1921, he became a corresponding member of the Russian Academy of Sciences, becoming a full member in 1927. He was also active in the Russian Association of Scientific Institutes for Research in the Social Sciences (RANION). From 1922 to 1924, he published an Annually journal of general history along with Fyodor Uspensky. Tarle had achieved distinction as a specialist in modern history through his book Europe in the Age of Imperialism.

During 1928–1931, Tarle was frequently criticized by his colleagues in articles published in Istorik-Marksist and in Borba Klassov. Between 1929 and 1931, a group of prominent historians were arrested by the State Political Directorate following the Academic Case (also known as The Case of Platonov). They were accused of hatching a plot to overthrow the Soviet government. In 1930, Tarle was arrested as well, accused of "being an "interventionist" and a "traitor" destined to be the foreign minister in a restored capitalist government". On 8 August 1931, he was exiled to Almaty where he spent the next four years.

Post-exile
After Tarle returned from exile in early 1934, he got back to his academic work in Leningrad and wrote two significant works on the Napoleonic period: a biography of Napoleon (Napoleon) published in 1936 and Napoleon’s Invasion of Russia, 1812 published in 1938. They were of great importance for estimating the change in Tarle's interpretation of history. Tarle's scholarly work during this period is the subject of much controversy. A. Roland, while praising Tarle for being a renowned authority on the Napoleonic era and having clearly understood the epoch of the Napoleonic wars, accuses him of having refracted the impact of the French revolution through the person of Napoleon.

Tarle's description of the Napoleonic Empire in Napoleon (1936) had mostly been perceived as a study in the classic Marxist tradition. He had repeated the basic ideas of Mikhail Pokrovsky on the 1812 campaign and interpreted Napoleon from the viewpoint of the class-struggle. Like Pokrovsky, Tarle treated the Russian people's patriotism and the talents of the Russian commanders as of lesser significance. However, according to Erickson, "Tarle’s interpretation differed from the more rigid economic interpretation of the Pokrovski school". Unlike Pokrovsky, Tarle brought individuals in the foreground. Napoleon was recognized as an influential historical figure.

The Battle of Borodino was not termed a victory in his work and the resistance to Napoleon was claimed as being "never a popular, national war". He stated that "there was no mass participation by the peasantry in the guerilla bands and in their activities, and their part in the campaign was strictly limited".  According to Tarle, “... it is clear that if the Spanish guerilla warfare might justifiably be called a national war, it would be impossible to apply this term to any Russian movement in the war of 1812".  Tarle supported his interpretation by "denying that the peasants fought against the French and describing the burning of Smolensk and Moscow as systematic acts of the Russian army in retreat".  Naturally, Tarle also gave references to Lenin's words on Napoleon in his book. Tarle's biography of Napoleon, according to Black, was accepted as "the final word in the analysis of the 1812 campaign" when it was first published in 1936. However, his interpretation met severe criticism.

The same year brought a radical change in Soviet historiography: A critical approach toward the 1812 campaign was no longer permitted. At this point, Tarle was subjected to strong criticism among the society of historians all around the world. Émigré historians in the United States and historians in Europe wrote about Tarle soon after he completed a second book on the same theme in the history of the 1812 war. He prepared his new work in a comparatively shorter time and published it in 1938 under the title Napoleon’s Invasion of Russia, 1812. This book was translated into English and published in Great Britain in 1942.

In his new book, Tarle mixed Marxist ideology and Russian nationalism. This time, the war of 1812 was not presented as unexceptional as other wars of Napoleon. The war with Russia was "more frankly imperialistic than any other of Napoleon’s wars; it was more directly dictated by the interests of the French upper-middle class". The "principal theme of Tarle’s new work was his glorification of the heroism exhibited by the Russian people and the wise conduct of the campaign by the Russian commanders in general and by Kutuzov in particular". In his work of 1938, a strong emphasis was placed on Russian patriotism.

Post-World War II
Tarle spent the Great Patriotic War in evacuation in Kazan. From 1941 to 1943 he worked as a professor at the historico-philological department of the Vladimir Ulyanov-Lenin Kazan State University. From 1942 on, he was also a member of the Extraordinary State Commission that investigated Nazi war crimes.

In the post-war period, Tarle's 1938 book was subjected to severe and intemperate criticism, as Soviet historical writing was affected by the "theory of the counteroffensive". According to Erickson, the two important trends conflicting with the views of Tarle were "the campaign against the ‘cosmopolitanism’ ... and Stalin’s glorification of himself as a military genius".

In 1951, Bolshevik published an article written by the director of the War Museum in Borodino Sergey Kozhukhov. Tarle was accused of having made use of foreign sources to the detriment of those of Russian origin, of having emphasized the passive character of Kutuzov's maneuvers and of having claimed that Kutuzov was continuing the tactics of the Barclay de Tolly. In addition, Tarle was attacked for having failed to evaluate the Battle of Borodino as a clear-cut Russian victory, for having stated that Moscow was burned by the Russians themselves and for having assigned too much significance to the expanses of Russia, cold and hunger as factors in the defeat of the French army. According to Kozhukhov, Napoleon's Invasion of Russia, 1812, indicated the influence of bourgeois historiography. Tarle had not been sufficiently critical of "aristocratic-bourgeois" historians and had distorted the history of the "Fatherland War".

Tarle replied to Kozhukhov's criticism, stating that he had already begun work on a new book of the Napoleonic period, which would contain different interpretations than his earlier works. Tarle wrote, "In light of the recent victory over the Nazis, it was no longer possible to view Russian history, especially military history, in the same way. Valuable new materials and "chiefly Stalin’s enormously significant and illuminating judgment, published in 1947", had obliged Soviet historians to correct their errors and revise their interpretations of the war of 1812".

Among Tarle's works, another point which drew attention in the society of historians was his interpretation of the Crimean War. Tarle began working on the history of the Crimean War in the late 1930s. He was given access to otherwise inaccessible Russian archives for his work. The first volume, published in 1941, was awarded the Stalin Prize. The second volume appeared in 1943. His general approach to the history of the Crimean War is a "mixture of criticism of the imperialistic character of the war and glorification of the Russian people".

Tarle became one of the most influential figures on the historical front. His complete work was entitled "The City of Russian Glory: Sevastopol in 1854–1855" and was published in 1954 by the publishing house of the USSR Defense Ministry. The book was based on the two-volume study about the Crimean war, written by Tarle earlier. He compares the siege of 1854–1855 to the defense of Sevastopol in 1941–1942 while attacking Washington, Hitlerism, and West Germany. The Crimean War was presented by Tarle to the public as a war launched by the western states. According to Tarle, in 1854–1855 the defenders of Sevastopol not only fought for the city but also defended "the annexations, made by the Russian state and the Russian people in the times of Peter I and during the eighteenth and nineteenth centuries".

Death
Yevgeny Viktorovich Tarle died on 6 January 1955 in Moscow. He died before he could fulfill his intention of writing a new book on the war of 1812, though he came further into line with the theory of the "counteroffensive" in an article published in 1952. He was buried at the Novodevichy Cemetery. His wife Olga Tarle (1874–1955) died the same year, just a month later, and was buried near him. They lived together for over 60 years.  They had two adult children (d. and s.), both working in mathematical economy.

Memory
According to Hetnal, no other Soviet historian received so much attention as Tarle did both at home and abroad. Foreign historians have been fascinated by Tarle. The professor of Polish origin, Wiktor Weintraub, wrote an article devoted to him. Italian historian Franco Venturi also wrote an interesting article about Tarle. They were followed by Edgar Hösch and others; Tarle's writings had also been evaluated by Anatole Mazour. Another comprehensive work on Tarle was completed by Stanisław Wiśniewski, a Polish historian from Lublin. He stressed that Tarle's writings were of unequal value. The wide range of Tarle's interests, even within the Napoleonic field, the speed with which he worked, as well as the political situation in which he worked after 1936 and other reasons account for his shortcomings.

Works 
Napoleon's Invasion of Russia, 1812 (New York, Oxford University Press, 1942, 1971; (originally published in Russian in 1938).
Borodino
Napoleon
Talleyrand
Gorod russkoi slavy. Sevastopol v 1854–1855 gg. (Moscow: Voennoe izdatelstvo Ministerstva oborony Soiuza SSR, 1954.
Krymskaia voina, 2 vols. (Moscow and Leningrad, 1950)
Nakhimov. Moscow, 1948.

Further reading
 Erickson, Ann K. "E.V. Tarle: The Career of a Historian under the Soviet Regime", American Slavic and East European Review, Vol. 19, No. 2. (Apr. 1960), pp. 202–216.

References

External links
Yevgeny Tarle at the Russian Academy of Sciences website
Yevgeny Tarle biography, St. Petersburg Institute of History (in Russian)

1874 births
1955 deaths
20th-century Russian historians
Burials at Novodevichy Cemetery
Corresponding Members of the Russian Academy of Sciences (1917–1925)
Full Members of the USSR Academy of Sciences
Historians of the French Revolution
Recipients of the Order of Lenin
Soviet historians
Soviet rehabilitations
Stalin Prize winners
Taras Shevchenko National University of Kyiv alumni
Ukrainian Jews
Academic staff of the University of Tartu
Members of the Saint Petersburg Institute of History
Corresponding Fellows of the British Academy